All Aunt Hagar's Children (2006) is a collection of short stories by African-American author Edward P. Jones; it was his first book after winning the 2004 Pulitzer Prize for The Known World. The collection of 14 stories centers on African Americans in Washington D.C. during the 20th century. The stories can be broken down by how the characters suffer burdens from families, society, and themselves. "Each story traces a journey--planned or unplanned, taken or failed--and an obvious root/route symbolism runs throughout the collection." Jones is noted for writing long short stories and these are no exception, they are sometimes called "novelistic", characters are fully fleshed out.

The stories of his first and third book are connected. As Neely Tucker says:
"There are 14 stories in "Lost," ordered from the youngest to the oldest character, and there are 14 stories in "Hagar's," also ordered from youngest to oldest character. The first story in the first book is connected to the first story in the second book, and so on. To get the full history of the characters, one must read the first story in each book, then go to the second story in each, and so on."

Footnotes

External links
 "Still Lost in the City", The New York Times Book Review
 The Quarterly Conversation review
 "Shining City, Tarnished Dreams", The Washington Post
 Review of All Aunt Hagar's Children
 Debbie Elliott, "Edward P. Jones' Tales of 'Aunt Hagar's Children'", NPR audio interview with Jones, August 27, 2006.

2006 short story collections
African-American short story collections
Works by Edward P. Jones
PEN/Faulkner Award for Fiction-winning works
Amistad Press books